Benjamin Oliveras (born February 7, 1981, in Perpignan) is a French football defender currently playing for French Ligue 2 side AC Arles-Avignon.

His previous clubs include Bordeaux, where he appeared in one Ligue 1 match, Nîmes Olympique and Stade Reims.

References

1981 births
Living people
French footballers
FC Girondins de Bordeaux players
Stade de Reims players
Nîmes Olympique players
Association football defenders
21st-century French people